is an original Japanese anime television series animated by studio 3Hz. The series is directed by Yasuhiro Irie, written by Noboru Kimura, and features character designs by Yukie Akiya, and music composed by Ryo Takahashi. It features singer voice actress choir unit Healer Girls, composed of the four main cast members. The series aired from April to June 2022.

Characters

A healer apprentice of Karasuma, Kana decided to become a healer after she had an asthma attack on a plane and a healer helped her recover. Kana has innate talent but sometimes struggles with technical skills and knowledge.

Hibiki is an apprentice healer along with Kana and Reimi. She is related to her teacher Karasuma, who comes to stay with Hibiki's large family in the country in the summer. She always loved to sing as a child and decided to become a healer when her elementary school music teacher encouraged her. She lives with Karasuma in the clinic.

Like Kana and Hibiki, Reimi is an apprentice of Karasuma, whom she idolizes. Reimi's parents are successful opera singers who live overseas. She lives with Aoi, a part-time maid and music student, who has become like a big sister to Reimi.

The mentor to Kana, Hibiki, and Reimi, who refer to her as shishō (mistress), Ria is a skilled and renowned healer who runs her own clinic and is known as "The Witch of KMU". Ria has a medical license but left the practice of Western medicine shortly after attaining it to become a music healer. She also conducts research on music healing, hoping to advance the field.

Media

Anime
The original anime television series created was announced on April 30, 2021. The series is animated by studio 3Hz and directed by Yasuhiro Irie, with Noboru Kimura writing the scripts, Yukie Akiya designing the characters, and Ryo Takahashi composing the music. The series aired from April 4 to June 20, 2022, on Tokyo MX and BS11. Healer Girls performed the opening theme song "Feel You, Heal You", as well as the ending theme song "Believe like Singing." Crunchyroll has licensed the series.

Episode list
The episodes in this series are called "Songs" (歌唱, kasho).

Spin-off manga
A spin-off manga series written and illustrated by Imo Ōno, titled Healer Girl espressivo, began serialization in Media Factory's Monthly Comic Alive magazine on May 26, 2022.

References

External links
Anime official website 

2022 anime television series debuts
3Hz
Anime with original screenplays
Crunchyroll anime
Media Factory manga
Music in anime and manga
Seinen manga